Canada competed at the 1984 Summer Paralympics in Stoke Mandeville, Great Britain and New York City, United States. 166 competitors from Canada won 238 medals including 87 gold, 82 silver and 69 bronze and finished 3rd in the medal table.

Medalists

See also 
 Canada at the Paralympics
 Canada at the 1984 Summer Olympics

References 

1984
Nations at the 1984 Summer Paralympics
1984 in Canadian sports